Lawrence Turner Veiller (1872–1959) was an American social reformer of the Progressive Era in New York. He was a major figure in the Good government and urban planning movements of the early twentieth century.

Early life and education
Lawrence Turnure Veiller was born in Elizabeth, New Jersey on January 7, 1872. Lawrence Veiller was the son of broker and factory owner, Philip Veiller and Elizabeth du Puy. Lawrence attended school in many states such as Massachusetts, Illinois, and New York. He graduated from the City College of New York in New York City in 1890. He took interest in social work by elaborating solutions for poor, harmful living conditions. He helped bring insight to building construction regulations.

Marriage and family
In 1897, Veiller married Amy Hall; they had no children.

Career
Veiller began his career with the Charity Organization Society (COS) as a volunteer, then worked as plans manager for the Buildings Department of the City of New York gaining knowledge about housing construction and finance (1895-1897). He was especially concerned with housing conditions among the poor, which he viewed as a crucial to broader social improvement.

Veiller served as executive officer of the Tenement House Committee (1898-1907). Veiller produced a Tenement Exhibition, consisting of visuals that where examples of the proposals to be set in New York City (1900). He then became secretary of the New York State Tenement House Commission (1900–01) through which he helped draft the New York State Tenement House Act (1901), which established basic housing laws in the city such as better fire exits and running water for bathrooms in every tenement. Veiller understood the importance of publicity in gaining support for his cause, and to this end worked with journalists like Jacob Riis, who used photography to document the living conditions of the poor.

Lawrence Veiller’s participation in housing affairs ended 1917. He still took interest of New York City’s urban reformation. He worked for traffic regulation, expansion of subway transportation, and control of francises.

After Lawrence Veiller’s active years of social reformation and regulation, his ideas fell out of favor. It became difficult to encourage quality construction regulations and control on housing for the poor. It became unaffordable to maintain, due to the Depression of 1929, his reforms for housing the poor ultimately receded.

Publications
Veiller published books in interest of the reform of tenement housing such as A Model Tenement House Law (1910), Housing Reform: A Hand-Book for Practical Use in American Cities (1910), and A Model Housing Law (1914; rev/ed., 1920).

References

American social activists
Activists from New York City
1872 births
1959 deaths